Kanwar Arsalan is a Pakistani television actor and a model.

Career 
Kanwar started his career as a Model but later entered in serials. He made his debut in Tum Jo Miley. After that he appeared in Pul Siraat, Talluq, Tahir-e-Lahoti, Kuch Unkahi Batien, Tum jo Milay, Bahu Rani, Haryalay Bannay, Larkiyan Mohallay ki, Mere Sanwariya Ka Naam, Merey Khuab Reza Reza, Palki, Khuab Ankhein Khwaish Chehray, and Meri Saheli Meri Hamjoli.

He starred in Kaash Main Teri Beti Na Hoti with his wife Fatima Effendi.

Personal life 
On 17 November 2012, he married Fatima Effendi in an Islamic wedding ceremony in Karachi. They both have a baby boy named Almeer.

Television

Television

Other Appearances

Telefilm 
 Shadi Ka Larka
 Valentine's Day Ka Phool
Khaala Garam Masala

References

Pakistani male television actors
Pakistani male models
Male actors from Karachi
1985 births
Living people